Shukty (Dargwa: Шукьта) is a rural locality (a selo) and the administrative centre of Shuktynsky Selsoviet, Akushinsky District, Republic of Dagestan, Russia. The population was 613 as of 2010. There are 6 streets.

Geography 
Shukty is located 11 km southwest of Akusha (the district's administrative centre) by road. Galshima is the nearest rural locality.

References 

Rural localities in Akushinsky District